Alberto Gaitero Martín (born 3 July 1996) is a Spanish judoka. He is a silver medalist at the Mediterranean Games and a two-time medalist at the European Judo Championships.

Career
He won the silver medal in the men's 66 kg event at the 2018 Mediterranean Games held in Tarragona, Spain. He competed at the World Judo Championships in 2017, 2018, 2019 and 2021.

In 2021, he competed in the men's 66 kg event at the Judo World Masters held in Doha, Qatar. A few months later, he won the silver medal in his event at the 2021 Judo Grand Slam Antalya held in Antalya, Turkey. He also won one of the bronze medals in the men's 66 kg event at the 2021 European Judo Championships held in Lisbon, Portugal.

He competed in the men's 66 kg event at the 2020 Summer Olympics in Tokyo, Japan where he was eliminated in his first match by Georgii Zantaraia of Ukraine.

Achievements

References

External links
 
 
 

Living people
1996 births
Place of birth missing (living people)
Spanish male judoka
Mediterranean Games silver medalists for Spain
Mediterranean Games medalists in judo
Competitors at the 2018 Mediterranean Games
Competitors at the 2022 Mediterranean Games
Judoka at the 2020 Summer Olympics
Olympic judoka of Spain
21st-century Spanish people